The Caracas Base Ball Club C.A. or better known by its commercial name as the Leones del Caracas, is a professional baseball team of the Venezuelan Professional Baseball League. In its creation, its headquarters are the University Stadium of Caracas at the Central University of Venezuela. The owner and sole shareholder of the sports club is Ricardo Cisneros, president of Ateneas Sports Holding.

Its name comes from the official name of the city of Caracas —Santiago de León de Caracas—, which Diego de Losada assigned to it when it was founded in 1567. Consequently, a lion appears as a symbol on the representative coat of arms of the city of Caracas.

Los Leones del Caracas is a very popular team in Venezuela, and is the team with the most titles (21), and has runners-up (17), played finals (34), played post-seasons (3&). Second highest win percentage in the LVBP in regular season: (D-D 2187-2100 51%), post-season: (D-D 206-178 55.0%), finals (D-D 97-78 55.4%).

History

Cervecería Caracas was founded in 1942, after Cervecería Princesa, an early team, was bought and transformed into Caracas. At first, the team played its home games at the old Estadio Cerveza Caracas, which was located in the capital city of Caracas. The team was founded by Martín Tovar Lange and managed by big leaguer Alejandro Carrasquel.

The Princesa team played its last game on May 7, 1942. Then, Caracas debuted four days later with a 7–3 victory over the Criollos. The game was played in Puerto Cabello, a city on the north coast of Venezuela.  Caracas faced its later nemesis, the Navegantes del Magallanes for the first time on December 27 of that year, winning this now historic game by a 3–0 score.

In its first stage, the team won two championship titles before moving to the Venezuelan Professional Baseball League in January 1946.

Since its inception, the Caracas team was characterized by having only Venezuelan players on their roster. The club changed its policy in 1950, after signing catcher Lester Fusselman and outfielder Maurice Mozzali, two St. Louis Cardinals prospects.

In 1952, the franchise was bought by the publicist and sport commentator Pablo Morales and christened Leones del Caracas as a new franchise. Since then, the team plays its home games at the Estadio Universitario in Caracas. Later, businessman Oscar Prieto Ortiz joined Morales as a legal partner.

Pete Rose was benched after a slump late in the 1964 MLB season, finishing with a .269 average, but continued to play winter ball in Venezuela with the Leones del Caracas team during the 1964–1965 season to improve his batting.

By 2001, the descendants of Morales and Prieto sold their shares to the Grupo Cisneros, giving it majority control of the team.

Through 2013, the Caracas team has won 20 championship titles (3 as Cervecería Caracas and 17 as Leones del Caracas), more than any other team in Venezuelan Professional Baseball League history.

In the 2015-16 season, they became the club with the highest average home attendance in the league, with an average of 10,845. The next season, the average attendance was 6,539.

Ballpark
The Estadio Universitario is a multi-use stadium located in Caracas, Venezuela. The stadium holds 22,690 people and was built in 1952.

This stadium forms part of the Central University of Venezuela campus and was designed by architect Carlos Raúl Villanueva.

Championship titles/Managers
1947-1948: Jose A. Casanova*
1948-1949: Jose A. Casanova*
1951-1952: Jose A. Casanova*
1952–1953: Martín Dihigo Vs Magallanes
1956–1957: Clay Bryant Vs Industriales de Valencia
1961–1962: Regino Otero Vs Indios de Oriente
1963–1964: Regino Otero Vs Industriales de Valencia
1966–1967: Regino Otero Vs Tiburones de La Guaira
1967–1968: Regino Otero Vs Tigres de Aragua
1972–1973: Oswaldo Virgil Vs Águilas del Zulia
1977–1978: Felipe Rojas Alou Vs Águilas del Zulia
1979–1980: Felipe Rojas Alou Vs Cardenales de Lara
1980–1981: Alfonso (Chico) Carrasquel Vs Cardenales de Lara
1981–1982: Alfonso (Chico) Carrasquel Vs Cardenales de Lara
1986–1987: Bill Plummer Vs Tiburones de La Guaira
1987–1988: Bill Robinson Vs Tigres de Aragua
1989–1990: Phil Regan Vs Cardenales de Lara
1994–1995: Pompeyo Davalillo Vs Águilas del Zulia
2005–2006: Carlos Subero Vs Tigres de Aragua
2009–2010: Dave Hudgens Vs Navegantes del Magallanes

* Won the title as Cervecería Caracas. The team changed owners and name in 1952, but documents made public on October 4, 2011, state that the franchise official name - Caracas Base Ball Club - remained constant during all sale transactions in 1949, 1952 and 2001. This has resulted in a change on the historical stats of Leones del Caracas, as reflected in the official page of the league.

Caribbean World Series titles
On February 9, 1982, the Leones earned Venezuela's third Caribbean World Series and the franchise's first, by defeating Dominican Republics's Leones del Escogido with a 3-1 score. The Leones ended the series with a record of 5 wins and 1 defeat. The Venezuelan team, with Alfonso Carrasquel at the helm, gained the championship title with a 5-1 record. Leones was led by catcher and Series MVP Baudilio Díaz (.412 BA, two home runs, five RBI, .500 OBP, .765 SLG), CF Tony Armas (.375, six RBI) and LF Luis Salazar (six runs, four stolen bases). The pitching staff was led by Luis Leal, who posted a 2-0 record with a 2.08 ERA and 10 strikeouts and a in 13.0 innings of work. Behind him were Bud Black (1-0, 1.29), Dennis Burtt (1-0, one save, seven SO in 10⅔ innings) and Tom Dixon (nine scoreless innings in Game 7). Venezuela also featured 2B Steve Sax, SS Ron Gardenhire, 1B Danny Garcia, 3B Leonardo Hernández, pinch-hitter Andrés Galarraga and pitcher Joe Cowley, among others.

On February 7, 2006, the Leones earned Venezuela's first Caribbean World Series title in 16 years, by defeating the Tigres del Licey of the Dominican Republic with a 5-4 score in the last game; this left the Leones with a record of six wins and no defeats at the 2006 Caribbean Series, ahead of Licey's four wins and two defeats record. With the victory, the Leones won Venezuela's sixth Caribbean Series title, and the franchise's second after the 1982 Caribbean Series. This also marked the first time a Venezuelan team sweeps the Caribbean Series, a feat previously accomplished only by teams from Cuba (Almendares in 1949, Habana in 1952, and Cienfuegos in 1960), from Puerto Rico (Cangrejeros de Santurce in 1953 and 2000, and Senadores de San Juan in 1995) and from the Dominican Republic (Tigres del Licey in 1971, 1977 and 1991, and Águilas Cibaeñas in 1998).

Retired uniform numbers

* Retired by VPBL

Current roster

See also
1953 Caribbean Series
1957 Caribbean Series
1980 Caribbean Series
1982 Caribbean Series
2006 Caribbean Series

References

External links
 Official Website

Central University of Venezuela
Baseball teams in Venezuela
Sport in Caracas
1952 establishments in Venezuela